Ethnic Vietnamese may mean:
 Việt Kiều or "Overseas Vietnamese", referring to people of Vietnamese descent not living in Vietnam
 Vietnamese people, referring to people of Vietnamese descent without restriction